Aleksandr Viktorovich Makarov (born 23 August 1978) is a retired Russian football goalkeeper.

External links
Club profile 
 Player page on the official FC Saturn Moscow Oblast website 

1978 births
Living people
People from Morshansk
FC Anzhi Makhachkala players
FC Saturn Ramenskoye players
PFC Krylia Sovetov Samara players
FC Sibir Novosibirsk players
Russian footballers
Russian Premier League players
Association football goalkeepers
FC Zenit-2 Saint Petersburg players
FC Dynamo Saint Petersburg players
FC Lokomotiv Saint Petersburg players
Sportspeople from Tambov Oblast